Elizabeth Jacobs (born 26 February 1989) is an Australian female acrobatic gymnast. With partners Amy Lang and Elodie Rousseau Forwood, Jacobs achieved 6th in the 2014 Acrobatic Gymnastics World Championships.

References

1989 births
Living people
Australian acrobatic gymnasts
Female acrobatic gymnasts
21st-century Australian women